Sharipovo (Şärip) is a rural locality (a selo) and the administrative centre of Sharipovsky Selsoviet, Kushnarenkovsky District, Bashkortostan, Russia. The population was 648 as of 2010. There are 14 streets.

Geography 
Sharipovo is located 26 km southeast of Kushnarenkovo (the district's administrative centre) by road. Sredneakbashevo is the nearest rural locality.

References 

Rural localities in Kushnarenkovsky District